Lucien Poincaré (22 July 1862 – 9 March 1920) was a distinguished French physicist.

Biography
Poincaré was born at Bar-le-Duc July 22, 1862. After a distinguished academic career he became in succession inspector general of physical science in 1902, director of secondary education at the Ministry of Public Instruction in 1910, director of higher education in 1914 and rector of the Academie de Paris in 1917. In that capacity he received President Wilson at the Sorbonne on the occasion of his visit to Paris for the Peace Conference. He was the brother of French Prime Minister Raymond Poincaré  and cousin of  mathematician and theoretical physicist Henri Poincaré.

Poincaré died in Paris March 9, 1920.

Selected publications
 La physique moderne, son évolution. Paris: Flammarion, Bibliothèque de philosophie scientifique, 1906, 1920 edition
 
 L’Électricité. Flammarion, Bibliothèque de philosophie scientifique, 1907, Archive
 Éducation, Science, Patrie. Flammarion, Bibliothèque de philosophie scientifique, 1926.

Notes

References

External links
 
 
 

Academic staff of the University of Paris
École Normale Supérieure alumni
1862 births
1920 deaths
People from Bar-le-Duc
Members of the Institute for Catalan Studies
Lycée Louis-le-Grand teachers